John R. Stegner (born November 8, 1953) is an associate justice of the Idaho Supreme Court and former state district court judge.

Early life and education
Born and raised in Grangeville, Idaho, Stegner is the youngest of four sons of Charles and  He earned his Bachelor of Arts degree in 1977 from Whitman College and his Juris Doctor from the University of Idaho College of Law in 1982.

Career
Stegner was in private practice in Lewiston for twelve years with Clements, Brown & McNichols. He clerked for the late United States District Judge  for two years and worked for the family business, Stegner Grain & Seed Co.

State judicial service
Stegner was previously a judge of the state's second judicial district, based in Moscow. He was appointed by Governor Phil Batt in November 1996, and served on the court from 1997 to 2018.

Idaho Supreme Court
In 2017, he was considered for a vacancy on the Idaho Supreme Court created by the retirement of Dan Eismann, but Governor Butch Otter appointed G. Richard Bevan in late August. Another vacancy soon arose with the sudden retirement of Warren Jones, and Otter appointed Stenger to the supreme court on May 22, 2018. He was selected from among four finalists named by the Idaho Judicial Council after public interviews with 14 applicants, including six sitting judges. Stegner is the only justice on the state's highest court from the Idaho Panhandle. He ran unopposed in the 2020 election, held during the state primary in the spring.

References

External links

Living people
1953 births
20th-century American judges
20th-century American lawyers
21st-century American judges
Justices of the Idaho Supreme Court
Idaho state court judges
University of Idaho College of Law alumni
Whitman College alumni